Soha  is a village of Haripur District in the Khyber Pakhtunkhwa province of Pakistan

Soha may also refer to:
Soha, Iran, village in Iran
Soha Junction, South Korea
SoHa controversy, a controversy regarding South Harlem
Soha (given name)